"The Greatest" is a song by British R&B singer and actor Raleigh Ritchie, released as the third single from his debut album, You're a Man Now, Boy.

Music video
On 13 March 2015, a music video for the song directed by Ritchie was uploaded to VEVO and YouTube; the video shows Ritchie and his friends in his friend's house while having a raving party. He slowly gets drunk within the first minute and tries to leave the party, but ends up getting sent back along with the party goers giving Ritchie drinks (in which he refuses); as the video ends, Ritchie had gotten so upset that he pushes the camera out of his face.

Track listing

Release history

References

2015 singles
2015 songs
Raleigh Ritchie songs
Columbia Records singles